Yiqiejing yinyi'' 一切經音義 is the title of:
Yiqiejing yinyi (Xuanying), a (c. 649) 25-chapter dictionary compiled by the monk Xuanying 玄應
Yiqiejing Yinyi (Huilin), a (c. 807) 100-chapter dictionary compiled by the monk Huilin 慧琳